Numerous designated cultural heritage sites are located in Xiguan, China.

National Cultural Heritage Sites 
There are two Major Sites Protected at the National Level in Xiguan:
Architectural complex on Shamian Island
Chen Clan Academy

Provincial Cultural Heritage Sites 
There are 3 Provincial Cultural Heritages in Xiguan:
Guangya Academy
Guangdong Postal Building
Guangdong Customs House

Municipal Cultural Heritage Sites 
There are 13 Municipal Cultural Heritages in Xiguan:
Hall of the Arhats in Hualin Temple
Martyrs Memorial Monument of Shaji Massacre
Renwei Temple
Old pawnshop on Huagui Lu
Taihua Building
Xiguan Residences
Archaeological site of Barbican and West City Gate of Guangzhou in Ming Dynasty (Ximenkou or West Gate)
Jinlun Guild Hall
Nanfang Building (or Nanfang Mansion)
Old pawnshop on Zhongshan Qilu
Old residential buildings
Huang Baojian's stone house
Five-mouthed Wells

Hualin Temple 

Hualin Temple is located in Hualinsi Qianjie, Xilai Chudi, Xiajiu Lu. Its predecessor was Xilai Buddhist Convent, set up during Emperor Wu of Liang years (20s, 6th century), Southern and Northern Dynasties by an Indian eminent monk, Bodhidharma, after he set up an altar to preach Buddhism. In 1655 (12th year of Shunzhi Emperor, Qing Dynasty), Zen Master Zongfu initiated its rehabilitation and changed its name to Hualin Temple. There used to be an Gilded Ashoka Pagoda and 500 Arhats' statues but some of them were destroyed afterwards.

Renwei temple 

Locate at front street of Renwei Temple, Longjin West Rd. It is in the old Bantang village, around 2,200 square kilometers area. The temple is for Zhenwu Emperor of Taoism, originally named Beidi Temple. It established in 1052 and it was the largest temple by the period. The government used to repair it in 1622, 1736 - 1795 and 1862 - 1874.

Jinlun Guild Hall

Five-mouthed Wells 

Taihua Building 
Taihua Building is located at No.27, Duobao Fang, Enning Lu. It used to be the study of Li Wentian, the Tanhua during Xianfeng Emperor years, Qing Dynasty. The building had a collection of 100 thousand books, some of which were lost during Second Sino-Japanese War. Moreover, some of the calligraphy works and paintings were taken away during Cultural Revolution.

Registered Cultural Heritage Sites 
There are 11 Registered Cultural Heritages in Xiguan:
Wen Tower
Liang Clan Ancestral Hall
Stele at Qinghao Archaic office of Wenlan Academy
Stele at Permanent Senate of Senior Official Lu who initiated Yue (Guangdong)
Taotaoju Tea House
Lianxianglou Tea House
Taying Building
Former site of Lingnan Institute of Art & Literature
Guangzhou Restaurant
Panxi Restaurant
Xiehe Hall

Wen Tower 
With a height of 13 meters, the Wen Tower stands in Pantang, which used to be the flowery orchard of King Liu in Southern Han. It was built to enshrine and worship Wenqu Xing sometime between Mid-Ming Period and Early Qing.

Heritage preservation measures 
Cultural Heritages Management Office of Liwan District was founded in 1998.

The Cultural Heritages Preservation Liaison System among the District, Subdistricts and residential communities was founded in 2001.

Liwan Government had invested funds of totally 59.383 million RMB yuan to preserve cultural heritages by 2001.

References

Liwan District
History of Guangzhou